Bethesda Christian Schools is a private Christian school in Brownsburg, Indiana. Bethesda is accredited through the state of Indiana and the Association of Christian Schools International (ACSI) for grades K through 12.  BCS also has an academic preschool program for ages 3 and 4. The school is affiliated with Parkside Bible Church, also located in Brownsburg.

Elementary
Elementary includes grades Kindergarten through sixth grade. Preschool for ages three and four is also available. There are half day and full day options for both Preschool and Kindergarten.  The purpose  is: "Reaching hearts, teaching minds."

High school
High School has grades 7-12. The High School offers Core 40 and Honors diploma. AP courses such as Biology, Calculus, English, European History and Chemistry are offered.
Seniors attend a leadership camp in August. On their senior trip, students have the opportunity to participate in mission work.

Athletics
Bethesda Christian joined the Indiana High School Athletic Association (IHSAA) in 2002.

Bethesda sports

Boys sports
Soccer
Basketball
Baseball
Cross Country
Golf

Girls sports
Volleyball
Basketball
Cheer-leading
Softball
Cross Country
Soccer

See also
 List of high schools in Indiana

References

External links
 School website

Christian schools in Indiana
Private high schools in Indiana
Schools in Hendricks County, Indiana
Private middle schools in Indiana
Private elementary schools in Indiana
1965 establishments in Indiana